Jennifer Button (born October 15, 1977) is a former female butterfly and freestyle swimmer from Canada, who competed for her native country at the 2000 Summer Olympics in Sydney, Australia.  Her best result was finishing in fifth place in the women's 4x200-metre freestyle relay event.

References
 

1977 births
Living people
Canadian female butterfly swimmers
Canadian female freestyle swimmers
Olympic swimmers of Canada
Sportspeople from British Columbia
Swimmers at the 2000 Summer Olympics
Commonwealth Games medallists in swimming
Commonwealth Games bronze medallists for Canada
Pan American Games silver medalists for Canada
Pan American Games medalists in swimming
Swimmers at the 1999 Pan American Games
Swimmers at the 2002 Commonwealth Games
Medalists at the 1999 Pan American Games
People from Comox, British Columbia
Medallists at the 2002 Commonwealth Games